Events from the year 1772 in Russia

Incumbents
 Monarch – Catherine II

Events

 
 Mogilev Governorate
 Zhivopisets

Births

Deaths

 
 December 26 - Pyotr Saltykov, Russian statesman and a military officer. (born c. 1697/1698/1700)

References

1772 in Russia
Years of the 18th century in the Russian Empire